Sheku Badara Bashiru Dumbuya (born November 25, 1945), commonly known as S.B.B. Dumbuya, is a Sierra Leonean politician and former Speaker of the House of Parliament of Sierra Leone. A prominent member of the ruling All People's Congress (APC), S.B.B. Dumbuya was elected as Speaker on January 21, 2014 with one hundred parliamentarians voted in his favor, and fifteen parliamentarians voted for his opponent Bu-Buakei Jabbi of the main opposition Sierra Leone People's Party (SLPP). S.B.B. Dumbuya succeeded Abel Nathaniel Bankole Stronge as speaker.

Born and raised in the capital Freetown, S.B.B. Dumbuya was previously the majority leader of the House of Parliament of Sierra Leone. He also served as ambassador to China and other Asian countries. He is an elected representative in the House of Parliament of Constituency 100 in the Freetown's neighbourhood of Kissi in the Western Area Urban District. He was re-elected in a landslide to Parliament in the 2012 Sierra Leone Parliamentary elections with 60.65%, defeating his closest rival Sheka Kanu of the Sierra Leone People's Party (SLPP) who took 30.76%. 
S.B.B. Dumbuya is a close ally of Sierra Leone's president Ernest Bai Koroma.

References

External links
“I will not support the Freedom of Information Bill” – Hon. S.B.B. Dumbuya threatens at Africa Young Voices
”We are here for regional integration and cooperation” ECOWAS Speaker at Awoko
Confirmed: Eddie Turay High Commissioner to UK
"Iranian MPs Arrive In Sierra Leone" at Global Time Online
"Majority Leader blasts SLAJ" at Sierra Leone News Hunters

1945 births
Living people
Speakers of the Parliament of Sierra Leone
All People's Congress politicians
Ambassadors of Sierra Leone
People from Freetown